Carl Richard (Dick) Söderberg (February 3, 1895October 17, 1979) was a power engineer and Institute Professor at the Massachusetts Institute of Technology.

Background 
Söderberg was born in the fishing village of Ulvöhamn, in Örnsköldsvik Municipality, Västernorrland County, Sweden. He enrolled at the Chalmers University of Technology in Gothenburg. In 1919 he graduated with a degree in naval architecture. On a fellowship from The American-Scandinavian Foundation, he came to MIT, where he was awarded the degree of Bachelor of Science in June 1920.

Career 
In 1922, Söderberg started at the Westinghouse Electric and Manufacturing Company. In 1928, he accepted an offer from ASEA to return to Sweden and head the development of a new line of large turbogenerators. In 1930, he returned to Westinghouse, where he was assigned to the Power Engineering Department.

In 1938, Söderberg was offered a faculty appointment in the Department of Mechanical Engineering at MIT. In 1954, he was appointed dean of the School of Engineering. He resigned as dean in 1959 and was appointed to the position of Institute Professor. Söderberg had a total of eighteen U.S. patents issued in the years from 1935 to 1950, all relating to constructional features of turbines.

Söderberg was a member of many professional societies.  He was elected to the United States National Academy of Sciences in 1947 and to the National Academy of Engineering in 1974. He was also a fellow of the American Academy of Arts and Sciences and the Royal Swedish Academy of Engineering Sciences. In 1958 he was made a knight of the Order of the Polar Star by the King of Sweden and in 1968 a commander of the Royal Order of the North Star.

On the occasion of Söderberg's eightieth birthday in 1975, MIT announced the establishment of the Carl Richard Soderberg Professorship of Power Engineering.

Selected works 
The Mechanical Engineering Department  (Massachusetts Institute of Technology. 1947)
 My Life (Public Relations Group. 1979)

References

Other sources 
Benson, Adolph B. and Naboth Hedin, eds. (1938) Swedes in America, 1638–1938 (The Swedish American Tercentenary Association. New Haven, CT: Yale University Press) 
Carl Richard Söderberg, Stephen P. Timoshenko (National Research Council. Biographical Memoirs V.53. Washington, DC: The National Academies Press, 1982.) 

1895 births
1979 deaths
People from Örnsköldsvik Municipality
Swedish emigrants to the United States
20th-century American educators
20th-century American engineers
Massachusetts Institute of Technology alumni
Chalmers University of Technology alumni
MIT School of Engineering faculty
Order of the Polar Star
Members of the Royal Swedish Academy of Engineering Sciences
Members of the United States National Academy of Sciences
ASME Medal recipients